Unlimited! is a 1987  electro-funk album, the third solo album by Zapp frontman Roger Troutman (credited as "Roger").  It includes a cover of James Brown's 1965 single "Papa's Got a Brand New Bag," as well as Roger's biggest R&B and crossover hit (on the pop charts), "I Want to Be Your Man."

Track listing

Personnel

Musicians
Roger Troutman: Lead vocals, talk box, guitar, keyboards, synthesizer, bass, congas, percussion, backing vocals
Terry "Zapp" Troutman: Bass, keyboards, backing vocals
Billy Beck: Keyboards, backing vocals
Curtis Cowen: Keyboards
Lester Troutman: Drums, congas, percussion
Dale DeGroat: Keyboards
Johnny Lytle: Vibraphone
Carl Cowen, James Cameron: Horns
Additional backing vocalists: Clete Troutman, Mark Thomas, Nicole Cottom, Ray Davis, Shirley Murdock

Production
Producer: Roger Troutman
Editor: Roger Troutman, Zapp Troutman, Curtis Cowen, Tony Jackson
Mixing: Roger Troutman, Zapp Troutman, Curtis Cowen, Tony Jackson
Engineer [Editing, Mixing, Recording] - Curtis Cowen, Lester Troutman, Charles Jackson

References

External links
Unlimited at Allmusic.

1987 albums
Roger Troutman albums
Reprise Records albums